Blepharomastix is a genus of moths of the family Crambidae described by Julius Lederer in 1863.

Species
Blepharomastix achroalis (Hampson, 1913)
Blepharomastix adustalis (C. Felder, R. Felder & Rogenhofer, 1875)
Blepharomastix aguirrealis (Schaus, 1940)
Blepharomastix apertisigna (Hampson, 1912)
Blepharomastix aphenice (Hampson, 1907)
Blepharomastix astenialis (Dyar, 1922)
Blepharomastix bademusalis (Schaus, 1924)
Blepharomastix batracalis (Guenée, 1854)
Blepharomastix benetinctalis (Dyar, 1914)
Blepharomastix beuvealis (Schaus, 1924)
Blepharomastix biannulalis (Hampson, 1907)
Blepharomastix branealis (Schaus, 1924)
Blepharomastix caclamalis (Schaus, 1924)
Blepharomastix carillalis (Schaus, 1912)
Blepharomastix carthaghalis (Schaus, 1924)
Blepharomastix caulealis (Schaus, 1924)
Blepharomastix cayugalis (Schaus, 1924)
Blepharomastix cirrosalis (C. Felder, R. Felder & Rogenhofer, 1875)
Blepharomastix coatepecensis Druce, 1895
Blepharomastix coeneusalis (Walker, 1859)
Blepharomastix colubralis (Guenée, 1854)
Blepharomastix costaliparilis Munroe, 1995
Blepharomastix costalis (Walker, 1866)
Blepharomastix cronanalis (Schaus, 1924)
Blepharomastix crusalis Druce, 1895
Blepharomastix cylonalis (Druce, 1895)
Blepharomastix dadalis (Druce, 1895)
Blepharomastix diaphanalis (Schaus, 1920)
Blepharomastix eborinalis Snellen, 1899
Blepharomastix epistenialis (Klima, 1939)
Blepharomastix fusalis (Hampson, 1917)
Blepharomastix fuscilunalis (Hampson, 1907)
Blepharomastix garzettalis (C. Felder, R. Felder & Rogenhofer, 1875)
Blepharomastix gigantalis Druce, 1895
Blepharomastix glaucinalis (Hampson, 1917)
Blepharomastix glaucoleuca (Hampson, 1913)
Blepharomastix griseicosta (Hampson, 1918)
Blepharomastix guianalis (Schaus, 1924)
Blepharomastix haedulalis (Hulst, 1886)
Blepharomastix hedychroalis Swinhoe, 1907
Blepharomastix herreralis (Schaus, 1924)
Blepharomastix hydrothionalis (Snellen, 1875)
Blepharomastix hyperochalis (Dyar, 1914)
Blepharomastix ianthealis (Walker, 1859)
Blepharomastix indentata (Hampson, 1912)
Blepharomastix ineffectalis (Walker, 1862)
Blepharomastix inflexalis (Hampson, 1912)
Blepharomastix interruptalis (Hampson, 1907)
Blepharomastix irroratalis (Hampson, 1907)
Blepharomastix lacertalis (Guenée, 1854)
Blepharomastix leuconephralis (Hampson, 1918)
Blepharomastix leucophaea (Hampson, 1912)
Blepharomastix marialis (Schaus, 1924)
Blepharomastix melitealis (Walker, 1859)
Blepharomastix monocamptalis (Hampson, 1918)
Blepharomastix mononalis (Dyar, 1918)
Blepharomastix obscura (Warren, 1889)
Blepharomastix obscuralis Snellen, 1899
Blepharomastix pacificalis (Schaus, 1912)
Blepharomastix pallidipennis (Warren, 1889)
Blepharomastix paracausta Meyrick, 1934
Blepharomastix poasalis (Schaus, 1912)
Blepharomastix potentalis (Barnes & McDunnough, 1914)
Blepharomastix primolalis (Schaus, 1924)
Blepharomastix prophaealis (Dognin, 1913)
Blepharomastix pseudoranalis (Barnes & McDunnough, 1914)
Blepharomastix pulverulalis Druce, 1895
Blepharomastix ranalis (Guenée, 1854)
Blepharomastix randalis (Druce, 1895)
Blepharomastix rufilinealis (Hampson, 1918)
Blepharomastix sabulosa (Hampson, 1913)
Blepharomastix saponalis (Guenée, 1854)
Blepharomastix saurialis (Guenée, 1854)
Blepharomastix schistisemalis (Hampson, 1912)
Blepharomastix semifuscalis (Hampson, 1907)
Blepharomastix stenialis (Dyar, 1914)
Blepharomastix stenothyris (Meyrick, 1936)
Blepharomastix strigivenalis (Hampson, 1918)
Blepharomastix styxalis (Schaus, 1924)
Blepharomastix turiafalis (Schaus, 1924)
Blepharomastix veritalis (Dyar, 1914)
Blepharomastix vestalialis Snellen, 1875
Blepharomastix vilialis (Guenée, 1854)
Blepharomastix zethealis (Schaus, 1912)

References

 
Spilomelinae
Crambidae genera
Taxa named by Julius Lederer